Trogolaphysa carpenteri is a species of aquatic springtail that is known from Argentina, Costa Rica, Mexico, and Cayenne, French Guiana.

References

Collembola
Animals described in 1925
Arthropods of South America